Łukasz Banak (born September 4, 1983 in Międzyrzecz) is an amateur Polish Greco-Roman wrestler, who competed in the men's super heavyweight category. He won a bronze medal in his division at the 2007 CISM World Military Games in Hyderabad, India. He is also a member of WKS Slansk in Wrocław, and is coached and trained by Jozef Tracz.

Banak represented Poland at the 2012 Summer Olympics in London, where he competed in the men's 120 kg class. He defeated Tunisia's Radhouane Chebbi in the preliminary round of sixteen, before losing out the quarterfinal match to Estonia's Heiki Nabi, who was able to score one point each in two straight periods, leaving Banak without a single point. Because his opponent advanced further into the final match, Banak had another shot for the bronze medal by entering the repechage bouts. Unfortunately, he was defeated in the first round by Belarus' Ioseb Chugoshvili, with a technical score of 0–3.

References

External links
 Profile – International Wrestling Database
 Łukasz Banak at NBC Olympics website
 
 

Polish male sport wrestlers
1983 births
Living people
Olympic wrestlers of Poland
Wrestlers at the 2012 Summer Olympics
People from Międzyrzecz
Sportspeople from Lubusz Voivodeship
20th-century Polish people
21st-century Polish people